The 2021 season was the Cleveland Browns' 69th season as a member of the National Football League (NFL), their 73rd overall and their second under head coach Kevin Stefanski and general manager Andrew Berry. The Browns finished 8–9, failing to improve upon their 11–5 record from 2020. They did not qualify for the playoffs. For the 75th anniversary of the team's founding in 1946, the Browns introduced a commemorative logo in January to use for the season.

Offseason

Re-signings

Players added

Players lost

Draft

Pre-draft trades
Cleveland acquired a third-round selection and a 2020 third-round selection from New Orleans in exchange for 2020 third- and seventh-round selections.
Cleveland acquired a fourth-round selection from Philadelphia in exchange for defensive end Genard Avery.
Cleveland acquired a fifth-round selection from the Los Angeles Rams in exchange for offensive lineman Austin Corbett.
Cleveland traded its original fifth-round selection to Jacksonville in exchange for safety Ronnie Harrison.
Cleveland acquired a seventh-round selection and guard Wyatt Teller from Buffalo in exchange for 2020 fifth- and sixth-round selections.
 Cleveland traded its original seventh-round selection to Denver in exchange for fullback Andy Janovich.

Undrafted free agents

Staff

Final roster

Preseason

Regular season

Schedule
The Browns' 2021 schedule was announced on May 12.

Note: Intra-division opponents are in bold text.

Game summaries

Week 1: at Kansas City Chiefs

With the loss, the Browns started their season at 0–1.  The Browns failed to win in Week 1 for the 17th straight season.

Week 2: vs. Houston Texans

With the win, the Browns improved to 1–1.

Week 3: vs. Chicago Bears

With the win, the Browns improved to 2–1.  The Browns' defense set franchise records for fewest yards allowed (47) and fewest net passing yards allowed (1).  DE Myles Garrett set a franchise record with 4.5 sacks and was named AFC Defensive Player of the Week.

Week 4: at Minnesota Vikings

This was Browns head coach Kevin Stefanski's first return to Minneapolis since leaving the Vikings in January 2020 to become the Browns head coach. Stefanski served as an assistant coach for the Vikings from 2006 to 2019.

With the win, the Browns improved to 3–1.  This marked the Browns' sixth consecutive win over NFC opponents.

Week 5: at Los Angeles Chargers

With the loss, the Browns fell to 3–2.  The Browns became the first team in NFL history to lose a game despite scoring 40+ points and having no turnovers.  Such teams were previously 442–0.

Week 6: vs. Arizona Cardinals

With the loss, the Browns fell to 3–3. This loss ended a 6-game winning streak over NFC opponents and marked the first time the Browns lost consecutive games under head coach Kevin Stefanski.  Starting quarterback Baker Mayfield left the game after aggravating a shoulder injury he suffered earlier in the season. Mayfield was ruled out for the following game, ending his streak of 51 consecutive starts at quarterback, the second longest stretch in franchise history (trailing only Brian Sipe's 70 consecutive starts from 1978–82).

Week 7: vs. Denver Broncos

With the win, the Browns improved to 4–3.  RB D'Ernest Johnson was named the FedEx Ground Player of the week.  Johnson, who was making his first career start in place of injured RBs Nick Chubb and Kareem Hunt, had 22 carries for 146 yards and a touchdown, including several key runs to run out the clock and preserve the win.

Week 8: vs. Pittsburgh Steelers

With the loss, the Browns fell to 4–4. 

On November 5, the Browns announced their intentions to release WR Odell Beckham Jr.

Week 9: at Cincinnati Bengals

With the win, the Browns improved to 5–4.  The 25-point margin of victory was the Browns' largest since 2003. RB Nick Chubb was named FedEx Ground Player of the Week. Chubb rushed for 137 yards on 14 carries with two touchdowns.

Week 10: at New England Patriots

With the loss, the Browns fell to 5–5.  The 38-point margin of defeat was the Browns' largest since 2005.

Week 11: vs. Detroit Lions

With the win, the Browns improved to 6–5.  This win ended a four-game losing streak to the Lions, as this was the Browns first win over the Lions since 2001.

Week 12: at Baltimore Ravens

With the loss, the Browns went into their bye week at 6–6.  The Browns' sixth loss on the season means they did not improve upon their 11–5 record from 2020.

Week 14: vs. Baltimore Ravens

With the win, the Browns improved to 7–6.  During the game, Myles Garrett set the franchise record for most sacks in a season, with 15.

Week 15: vs. Las Vegas Raiders

After 25 Browns players and three coaches, including head coach Kevin Stefanski, tested positive for COVID-19 in the week leading up to the game, the game was postponed from its original date of December 18 to December 20.  During this time, three players were able to test negative and be activated, but the majority of the infected players were ruled out. With starting QB Baker Mayfield and backup QB Case Keenum sidelined with the virus, third-string QB Nick Mullens made his first start with the Browns. Special teams coach Mike Priefer served as acting head coach for the game.

With the loss, the Browns fell to 7–7.

Week 16: at Green Bay Packers

This game marked the first time in franchise history that the Browns played on Christmas Day.  

With the loss, the Browns fell to 7–8, and had 6 one-score game losses, the most in the NFL

Week 17: at Pittsburgh Steelers

On January 2, Cincinnati defeated Kansas City to clinch the AFC North title. This marks the Browns’ 29th consecutive season without winning a division title. With the Los Angeles Chargers’ win over Denver later that day, the Browns were eliminated from playoff contention.

With their 18th straight regular season loss in Pittsburgh, the Browns fell to 7–9.  They finished 2–6 in away games.

Week 18: vs. Cincinnati Bengals

With the win, the Browns finished the season 8–9. They finished 6–3 in home games.  The Browns swept the Bengals in back-to-back seasons for the first time since 1994 and 1995.

Standings

Division

Conference

Team leaders

Regular season

Awards
The following Browns were awarded for their performances during the season:

AFC Defensive Player of the Week/Month

2022 Pro Bowl 
On December 20, it was announced that G Joel Bitonio, RB Nick Chubb, DE Myles Garrett, G Wyatt Teller, and CB Denzel Ward were named to the AFC Pro Bowl roster, with Bitonio and Garrett named as starters.  This marks the fourth Pro Bowl selection for Bitonio, the third for Chubb and Garrett, the second for Ward, and the first for Teller.

References

External links 
 2021 Cleveland Browns at Pro Football Reference (Profootballreference.com)
 2021 Cleveland Browns Statistics at jt-sw.com
 2021 Cleveland Browns Schedule at jt-sw.com
 2021 Cleveland Browns at DatabaseFootball.com 
 

Cleveland
Cleveland Browns seasons
Cleveland Browns